The interpeduncular fossa is a deep depression of the ventral surface of the midbrain between the two crura cerebri.

It has been found in humans and macaques, but not in rats or mice, showing that this is a relatively new evolutionary region.

Anatomy 
The interpeduncular fossa is a somewhat rhomboid-shaped area of the base of the brain.

Features 
The lateral wall of the interpeduncular fossa bears a groove - the oculomotor sulcus - from which rootlets of the oculomotor nerve emerge from the substance of the brainstem and aggregate into a single fascicle.

Anatomical relations 
The ventral tegmental area lies at the depth of the interpeduncular fossa.

Boundaries 

The interpeduncular fossa is in front by the optic chiasma, behind by the antero-superior surface of the pons, antero-laterally by the converging optic tracts, and postero-laterally by the diverging cerebral peduncles.

The floor of interpeduncular fossa, from behind forward, are the posterior perforated substance, corpora mamillaria, tuber cinereum, infundibulum, and pituitary gland.

Contents 
Contents of interpeduncular fossa include oculomotor nerve, and circle of Willis.

The basal veins pass alongside the interpeduncular fossa before joining the great cerebral vein.

Clinical significance 
The most common locations for neurocutaneous melanosis have occurred along the interpeduncular fossa, ventral brainstem, upper cervical cord, and ventral lumbosacral cord.

See also
 Interpeduncular cistern
 Cerebral peduncles

Additional images

References

External links
 Diagram at UMich.edu

Cerebrum